Shaheedullah and Stereotypes is the debut solo studio album by Ali Shaheed Muhammad better known as a member of A Tribe Called Quest. It features the single "Banga". The album is now out of print and is currently the only solo studio album released by the rapper.

Reception

Del F. Cowie of Exclaim! said Muhammad had made "a confident step into solo territory" with Shaheedullah and Stereotypes. On the other hand, John Bush of AllMusic called the album "a troublesome record" while Dave Heaton of PopMatters said the album overall was "too run-of-the-mill".

Track listing
 Social Reform – 1:40
 Lord Can I Have This Mercy - (featuring Chip-Fu) – 3:11 
 Industry/Life – 3:05 
 Tight – (featuring Kay Jay) - 4:39 
 All Right (Aight)/Interlude – 4:04 
 Put Me On - (featuring Stokley Williams) – 5:13 
 Honey Child – 3:30 
 Family - (featuring Kay Jay) – 4:20 
 (They Can't) Define Our Love - (featuring Sy Smith) – 3:55 
 Banga - (featuring Stokley Williams) – 4:20 
 Part of the Night  – (featuring Sy Smith) - 4:23
 From DJs 2 Musicians To... - 2:22
 U Suckers - 3:05
 Matches - Don't Play!!! - 3:58
 All Night  – (featuring Wallace Gary) - 2:53
 I Declare - 4:18
 Elevated Orange - 4:48

Charts

References

2004 debut albums
A Tribe Called Quest albums